Robert Temple is the name of:

 Robert K. G. Temple (b. 1945), American author
 Anthony Robert Temple, known as Bob Temple (b. 1926), Canadian Member of Parliament from 1963 to 1965
 Robbie Temple, squash player